Oxycanus dirempta is a moth of the family Hepialidae. It is found in New South Wales and Victoria.

The wingspan is about 60 mm.

References

External links
linus.socs.uts.edu.au

Moths described in 1865
Hepialidae
Endemic fauna of Australia